TSV Milbertshofen is a sports club based in Milbertshofen a suburb in the north of Munich, Germany. Other sports supported by the club include basketball, tennis, boxing, aikido, judo, karate, taekwondo, track and field, wheelchair-rugby, shooting, skiing, gymnastics and yoga.

Accomplishments

Handball
 1990 German Cup and runner-up in the German Championship
 1991 EHF Cup Winner's Cup
 1992 EHF Cup Winner's Cup-finalist

The most famous player is Erhard Wunderlich (1984–1989). He also served the club as manager from 1990 to 1992. Erhard Wunderlich was elected Germany's player of the century in 1999.

Volleyball
 1990 German Cup
 1991 German Championship

Table tennis
 1952 German Team Championship
 1958 German Team Championship

The most famous player is Conny Freundorfer (*1936–†1988, between 1953 and 1961 nine times German singles champion), who joined the club in 1954. Peter Stellwag, between 1977 and 1981 four times German singles champion, played for the club between 1990 and 1992.

Football
Despite not having achieved any major titles in this sport, the club prides itself of having developed a number of players in more recent years that eventually managed to establish themselves in the higher leagues of Germany.

The clubs football side reached its pinnacle when it won promotion to the tier-four Landesliga Bayern-Süd in 1968. It suffered relegation from this level in 1971 and has not returned to it since. Since 2015–16, the team is playing in the tier-eight Kreisliga.

These days the club does not belong to the national top tier in any of these sports.

External links
Official team site
Official team site (football)

German handball clubs
Football clubs in Germany
Football clubs in Bavaria
Football in Upper Bavaria
1905 establishments in Germany
Association football clubs established in 1905
German volleyball clubs
Multi-sport clubs in Germany